Jhargram Government Medical College and Hospital (JGMCH) is a Government Medical college and hospital. The college is located at Jhargram city in Jhargram district, West Bengal. The college offers the degree Bachelor of Medicine and Surgery (MBBS) and associated degrees.

Courses
Jhargram Medical College and Hospital undertakes education and training of 100 students MBBS courses.

Affiliated
The college is affiliated with West Bengal University of Health Sciences and is recognized by the National Medical Commission.

References

Medical colleges in West Bengal
Affiliates of West Bengal University of Health Sciences